The IBM 1710 was a process control system that IBM introduced in March 1961. It used either a 1620 I or a 1620 II Computer and specialized I/O devices (e.g., IBM 1711 analog-to-digital converter and digital-to-analog converter, IBM 1712 discrete I/O and analog multiplexer, factory floor operator control panels).

The IBM 1620 used in the 1710 system was modified in several ways, the most obvious was the addition of a very primitive hardware interrupt mechanism.

The 1710 was used by paper mills, oil refineries and electric companies.

See also
IBM 1720
IBM 1800

References

External links
"Evolution of Small Real-Time IBM Computer Systems" (1.25 MB PDF file), from the IBM Journal of Research and Development.
IBM Archives:  IBM 1710 — Control system

1710
Computer-related introductions in 1961